

Games released or invented in the 1950s

Significant games-related events in the 1950s
Avalon Hill Game Company founded by Charles S. Roberts to publish the first board wargame, Tactics. For many years Avalon Hill was a dominant maker of wargames.

References

Games
Games by decade